Caloptilia recitata is a moth of the family Gracillariidae. It is known from China (Sichuan, Jiangxi, Fujian, Hunan, Guizhou), Hong Kong, India (Meghalaya, Assam), Japan (Honshū, the Ryukyu Islands, Shikoku, Kyūshū) and Nepal.

The wingspan is 10–13 mm. There are two forms, an aestival (summer) and an autumnal form, which are distinct in colour-pattern. The aestival form has an ochre-brown forewing marked distinctly with a yellowish costal blotch, while the autumnal form has darker forewing with no distinct costal mark.

The larvae feed on Cotinus coggygria, Rhus javanica, Toxicodendron sylvestre and Toxicodendron trichocarpum. They mine the leaves of their host plant.

References

recitata
Moths of Asia
Moths described in 1918